There are two Catilli in Roman legend:

 Catillus the Arcadian, son of Amphiaraus.
 Catillus, his son.

Catillus the Arcadian and his sons Catillus, Coras, and Tiburtus  escaped the mass killing at Thebes and arrived at the Aniene Plateau. They drove away the Sicilians who lived there and founded a city named Tibur (now Tivoli) in honor of Tiburtus.

In Book VII of Virgil's Aeneid, the twin brothers, Catillus and Coras, leave Tibur and head for Latium to fight against Aeneas and the Trojans as an ally of Turnus.

References
 

Characters in the Aeneid
Characters in Roman mythology